Balanophyllia europaea, called also scarlet coral or pig-tooth coral, is a small species of stony coral in the family Dendrophylliidae.

Description
Pig-tooth corals are solitary hard corals with an oval shape. They grow to 4 to 6 cm in diameter and 2 cm in height. The body colour goes from light brown to green-brown, the polyp has almost transparent beaded tentacles which can have some red to yellow spots due to the presence of symbiotic micro-algae.

Distribution & habitat
This small madrepore is only found in the Mediterranean Sea. It likes shallow and bright underwater area and usually fixed itself on hard substrate like rocks, shells or other hard materials as deep as 50 m.

Biology
This species likes shallow places because it is a photophilous species, that means it needs sunlight to maintain alive its symbiotic micro-algae.

B. europaeas are simultaneous hermaphrodites and brooders that reproduce sexually once a year. After fertilization takes place in May and April, B. europaeas release their larvae in September and October. The 3 mm long planula larvae then settle after an average of seven days and begin to metamorphose into polyps and eventually full grown B. europaeas.

References

External links

 

Dendrophylliidae
Fauna of the Mediterranean Sea
Animals described in 1826